Jonathan Anastas is an American, Los Angeles-based marketing & advertising executive, and a musician who co-founded a number of Boston hardcore punk bands.

Punk rock musician
From his teen years (recording for the first time at age 15), Anastas was involved in the American musical movement known as hardcore punk. He co-formed and played bass in the seminal Boston hardcore bands DYS and Slapshot, writing and playing on the DYS records Brotherhood and DYS as well as Slapshot's debut record Back on the Map (all re-issued by Taang! Records in various formats).</ref> DYS, with Anastas, reformed for the first time in over 20 years, headlining the Gallery East Reunion Festival and "xxx All Ages xxx" movie shoot in front of over 1,000 fans on August 29, 2010.

Anastas and his bands were a part of the straight edge movement, made famous by Minor Threat as a call for youth to live a clean and conscientious life, rejecting drugs, alcohol and smoking. DYS are also known for their early role in the crossover movement where hardcore punk bands attempted a more commercial hard rock sound and looked toward recording deals within the mainstream major label system, inventing the idea of a "hardcore power ballad" to describe a track on their second metal-influenced album. holding executive positions at Mullen, Saatchi & Saatchi, Omnicom's Think New Ideas and Tribal DDB holding Red Urban, where he was president. Anastas ran marketing at Atari, the  video game publisher, was a senior marketing executive at Activision, was Chief Marketing Officer at The Enthusiast Network (TEN) until the company's sale to Discovery in 2017, then Chief Marketing Officer at LiveXLive Media (NASDAQ: LIVX). Jonathan is now Group CMO for ONE Championship and ONE esports. Anastas's work has been recognized by the Silicon Alley Reporter, The Industry Standard, Adweek and Ad Age. He has spoken at a number of Digital. Mobile, Content, Gaming and CMO conferences, both domestic and international. His 21st century campaigns have been awarded multiple EFFIES, Cannes Lions and other industry accolades.

References

External links
 Interview with Jonathan Anastas in NoEcho Mag
 
 Jonathan Anastas' Los Angeles
 Interview with Jonathan Anastas in Revolver Magazine

Year of birth missing (living people)
Living people
American punk rock musicians
American rock bass guitarists
American male bass guitarists
Musicians from Boston
American advertising executives